Naanal is a 1965 Indian Tamil-language comedy film, written and directed by K. Balachander. It is based on his play of the same name. The film stars R. Muthuraman, Major Sundarrajan, Srikanth, Sowcar Janaki, K. R. Vijaya and Nagesh. It was released on 24 December 1965 and failed at the box office.

Plot 

Four jailbirds escape from prison to take revenge on the judge who sentenced them. They take over his house, and the film builds around the judge and his family escaping from them.

Cast 
 R. Muthuraman as Inspector Baskaran
 Major Sundarrajan as Prisoner Arasu
 Sowcar Janaki as Savitri
 K. R. Vijaya as Jaya, Raghunathan's sister
 Srikanth as Murali
 Nagesh as Pattabi Raman
 S. N. Lakshmi as Lakshmi
 Shobha
 K. Vijayan as Judge Raghunathan
 Gemini Mali as Prisoner David
 Hari Krishnan as Prisoner Bairavan
 I. S. R. as Kesavan (Servant)
 Typist Gopu as Milk Man

Production 
Naanal was a play written by K. Balachander and inspired by the film The Desperate Hours (1955). After the release of Neerkumizhi, Balachander decided to adapt The Desparate Hours as the story for his next play after being impressed by the plot. Naanal was later adapted by him into a film with the same name after the film's producer Velumani felt it can be made into a film. Naanal marked the feature film debut of Typist Gopu.

When the film was submitted to the censor board for certification, an official raised objection against the film's concept, believing it may influence criminals in real life to take revenge in a similar manner and instructed Balachander to change the story and film it again. Balachander, who was shocked by this decision as the film was nearing its release, made changes to the film like redubbing lines of "Judge" and replacing it with "Durai" while also shooting a flashback scene to show the reason for the criminals' anger against the film's protagonist in one day and added it in the film. After making these changes, the certification was given.

Soundtrack 
Music was composed by V. Kumar and lyrics were written by Alangudi Somu and Suratha. A. R. Venkatachalapathy wrote, "[Suratha] had a knack for compiling data, making lists and turning them into poetry", citing "Vinnukku Melaadai" in Naanal as an example.

Release and reception 
Naanal was released on 24 December 1965. T. M. Ramachandran of Sport and Pastime positively reviewed the film, praising Sundarrajan's performance more than the other cast members. Kalki gave the film a less positive review, comparing it unfavourably to the source play. The film did not do well at the box-office.

Legacy 
The storyline of Crazy Mohan's play Crazy Thieves in Palavakkam was inspired by Naanal.

References

External links 
 

1960s Tamil-language films
1965 comedy films
1965 films
Films based on adaptations
Films directed by K. Balachander
Films with screenplays by K. Balachander
Indian black-and-white films
Indian comedy films
Indian films based on plays